Ivins may refer to:

People
Sorted by date of birth:
Anthony W. Ivins (1852–1934), official of The Church of Jesus Christ of Latter-day Saints
William Ivins Jr. (1881–1961), curator at the Metropolitan Museum of Art
Antoine R. Ivins (1888–1967), official of The Church of Jesus Christ of Latter-day Saints
Molly Ivins (1944–2007), American newspaper columnist
Bruce Edwards Ivins (1946–2008), American biomedical researcher
Marsha Ivins (1951), American astronaut 
Michael Ivins (1963), member of the band The Flaming Lips.

Places
Ivins, Utah

See also
Ivens (disambiguation)